Caron Bowman is a Black American artist of Afro-Honduran descent. She was born in the City of West Palm Beach, FL. and her parents are from Roatan, Bay Islands, Honduras. She works in a diverse spectrum of mediums including drawing, public art, painting, video, and fiber media. Many influences can be seen in her artwork including pop art, surrealism, hard-edge painting and graffiti art.

Description 
Caron Bowman is a multi-disciplined artist, curator, and arts activist. Her work spans many techniques including drawing, installations, public art, fiber art, murals, and painting. As a  BIPOC public art consultant, she has created art in public places programming (aipp)for the City of West Palm Beach Downtown Development Authority. Bowman is a member of Street Art Revolution a public art collective and design firm specializing in providing carefully curated and culturally responsive public art, civic design, and sculpture. She has a Bachelor of Arts degree in History and a Master of Arts degree in ESE. 
Utilizing a Florida aesthetic as a source of inspiration, her artwork is about the intensity of color, curved lines, and daring patterns unified into one language. She utilized automatic drawing techniques in order to develop her style.
In 2013, she was a featured artist in the Wynwood Miami Mix Art Fair. She was selected by Bombay Sapphire Corporation /Russell and Danny Simmons' Rush Philanthropic Art Foundation to be included in the Bombay Sapphire Artisan Series. The series showcases the best emerging artist in the United States.

Her artwork has been profiled by the Chagall Museum, and Hiroshima Museum of Art. In 2014, she was selected as a finalist for the Smithsonian American Latino Museum Campaign. The Beck's corporation selected her as a semi-finalist for the Beck's Green Box augmented reality series. The Green Box Project, a global fund established to inspire, celebrate and financially support independent talent in art, design, music, and fashion. The resulting art pieces will be experienced via augmented-reality in Green Boxes located around the world. Thirty internationally renowned creatives are heading up the project, and they include Nick Knight, Warpaint, Steve Harrington. Rapper Kendrick Lamar in association with Creative Allies showcased her artwork in NYC at the Galapagos Art Space. She has been profiled in publications including The American Latino Museum, The 2012 and 2013 Los Angeles African American Heritage Guide, Tom Joyner Foundation and Nick Knight's – SHOWstudio.

She participated as a board member of the Continuum - a satellite fair in collaboration with Art Palm Beach.

References

External links
 Caron Bowman 

Living people
Year of birth missing (living people)
American women painters
American video artists
American people of Honduran descent
Painters from Florida
People from West Palm Beach, Florida
21st-century American women artists
American contemporary painters